Scusate il ritardo (Sorry for the delay) is a 1983 Italian comedy film written, directed and starred by Massimo Troisi.

For this film Lina Polito was awarded with a David di Donatello for Best Supporting Actress and Lello Arena was awarded with a David di Donatello for Best Supporting Actor.

Cast 
Massimo Troisi: Vincenzo
Giuliana De Sio: Anna
Lello Arena: Tonino
Lina Polito: Patrizia,  Vincenzo's sister
Franco Acampora: Alfredo, Vincenzo's brother

See also       
 List of Italian films of 1983

References

External links

1983 films
Films directed by Massimo Troisi
Italian comedy films
1983 comedy films
Films set in Naples
1980s Italian-language films
1980s Italian films